Pilkey is a surname, and may refer to:

Dav Pilkey, children's author.
Orrin H. Pilkey, Professor emeritus of geology at Duke University.
Walter Pilkey, Professor of mechanical engineering at University of Virginia.
Cliff Pilkey, Canadian politician.
Allan Pilkey, Canadian politician.